Covesville is an unincorporated community in Albemarle County, Virginia, United States.

The community is listed on the National Register of Historic Places as the Covesville Historic District. In addition, Cove Presbyterian Church, Redlands, and Edgemont are individually listed on the National Register in the community.

Covesville First Baptist Church is a historically Black Church in Covesville.  On December 8, 1974, the church hosted Little Rev. Michael Dandridge in a benefit for the purchase of a communion table.  This event was sponsored by Sister Marion Dowell.

References

Unincorporated communities in Virginia
Unincorporated communities in Albemarle County, Virginia